Mohd Fauzan bin Dzulkifli (born 13 October 1987) is a Malaysian footballer who plays for Selangor United in Malaysia Premier League as a midfielder.

References

External links
 
1987 births
Living people
Malaysian footballers
PKNS F.C. players
Negeri Sembilan FA players
Selangor FA players
Felda United F.C. players
People from Selangor

Association football midfielders